Senator Cowles may refer to:

Charles H. Cowles (1875–1957), North Carolina State Senate
Robert Cowles (born 1950), Wisconsin State Senate
Thomas Cowles (1809–1884), Connecticut State Senate